Edward Alyn Warren (June 2, 1874 – January 22, 1940) was an American actor. He appeared in more than 100 films between 1915 and 1940. In some early silent films he was credited as Fred Warren or E. A. Warren. He was born in Richmond, Virginia and died in Woodland Hills, Los Angeles. He died at the age of 65.

Filmography

References

External links

1874 births
1940 deaths
American male film actors
American male silent film actors
20th-century American male actors